William Charles Summerscales (born 4 January 1949) is an English former footballer who played in central defence for Leek Town, Rochdale, Stafford Rangers, and Newcastle KB United (Australia). He helped Port Vale to win promotion out of the Fourth Division in 1969–70.

Career
Summerscales played for North Staffordshire College of Technology and Leek Town, before joining Port Vale for a £400 fee in February 1970. He played four times in the Fourth Division in the 1969–70 promotion campaign. He played seven Third Division games in the 1970–71 season, and scored his first senior goal on 19 December, in a 3–0 win over Rochdale at Spotland. He went on to score one goal (against Wrexham) in 28 games in the 1971–72 campaign. He scored three goals in 50 matches in the 1972–73 campaign, including Vale's consolation goal in a 3–1 defeat to Newcastle United in the League Cup. He came second to Ray Williams in that year's vote for the Port Vale Player of the Year award. He scored once in 27 games in the 1973–74 season, before his run in the first team was brought abruptly to a halt on 12 January 1974, when he broke his neck during a 2–2 draw with York City at Vale Park. After he returned to fitness, he had a new manager, as Gordon Lee left the club, and "Valiants" legend Roy Sproson took his place at Vale Park. Summerscales featured 29 times in the 1974–75 season, and was dropped from the first team in March 1975 before he was given a free transfer two months later. He moved on to Walter Joyce's Rochdale, and helped the "Dale" to finish 15th in the Fourth Division in 1975–76, and then 18th in 1976–77 under the stewardship of Brian Green. Summerscales scored four goals in 87 league games during his two seasons at Spotland. He then played in the Northern Premier League for Stafford Rangers before moving to Australia to join National Soccer League side Newcastle KB United; he later returned to England with Marquis.

Later life
Once he retired from the field, Summerscales became the under-15 coach at Stoke City and a committee member at Redgate United. He founded grocery company Morning Fresh in 1980 and moved into wholesaling five years later, ending the decade with four retail shops.

Career statistics
Source:

Honours
Port Vale
Football League Fourth Division fourth-place promotion: 1969–70

References

Footballers from Willesden
English footballers
Association football defenders
Leek Town F.C. players
Port Vale F.C. players
Rochdale A.F.C. players
Stafford Rangers F.C. players
English expatriate footballers
Expatriate soccer players in Australia
Newcastle KB United players
English Football League players
Northern Premier League players
National Soccer League (Australia) players
Association football coaches
Stoke City F.C. non-playing staff
English company founders
1949 births
Living people